Jack Raphael Ham Jr. (born December 23, 1948) is an American former professional football player who was an outside linebacker for the Pittsburgh Steelers of the National Football League (NFL) from 1971 to 1982. He is considered one of the greatest outside linebackers in the history of the NFL. Ham was inducted into the Pro Football Hall of Fame in 1988 and the College Football Hall of Fame in 1990. In mid-2019 the newsletter of the PSU Alumni Association rated Ham first among the 100 greatest athletes, considering all sports and all previous football players, in University history.

Early years
Ham was born and raised in Johnstown, Pennsylvania, where he attended Bishop McCort High School. He continued his education at Massanutten Military Academy in Woodstock, Virginia for a post-graduate season.

College football
Ham played college ball at Penn State.  In his three years as a starting linebacker, the Nittany Lions had records of 11-0, 11-0, and 7–3. In his senior year, 1970, Ham was co-captain, had 91 tackles, four interceptions, and was an All-American. He had 251 career tackles, 143 unassisted. He blocked three punts in 1968, setting a school record that was not tied until 1989. He was inducted into the College Football Hall of Fame in 1990.

On December 11, 2014, the Big Ten Network included Ham on "The Mount Rushmore of Penn State Football", as chosen by online fan voting. Ham was joined in the honor by John Cappelletti, LaVar Arrington and Shane Conlan.

Professional football career
Ham was selected by the Pittsburgh Steelers in the second-round (34th overall) of the 1971 NFL Draft. He won the starting left linebacker job as a rookie. He was first-team All-Pro six years and was named to eight straight Pro Bowls. Ham was blessed with tremendous quickness — according to Steelers coach Chuck Noll and teammate Andy Russell he was the "fastest Steeler for the first ten yards, including wide receivers and running backs". He was one of the few outside linebackers who could play pass defense as well as the NFL's top safeties. Although he was a ferocious hitter, he was known as a player who could not be fooled and was seldom out of position. Maxie Baughan, a former NFL linebacker said of Ham, "He was one of the more intelligent players to ever play that position. He was able to diagnose plays. You couldn't ever fool him." Despite not being as revered as teammate Jack Lambert by fans (as well as not being as feared by opponents), some have regarded Ham as a better outside linebacker than Lambert as a middle linebacker during the Steelers dominance of the 1970s.

Ham's career statistics include 25 sacks, 21 fumbles recovered, and 32 interceptions (although the sack numbers are unofficial since the NFL did not begin recording sacks until Ham's final year in the league, so he officially has just three sacks). As these numbers indicate, Ham had a flair for the big play, guided by some of the best football instincts ever found in a linebacker.  Ham was a member of four Super Bowl winning teams during his 12-year career (although he did not play in Super Bowl XIV due to an ankle injury), all of it spent with the Steelers.  His 53 takeaways are the most in NFL history by a non-defensive back, while his 32 interceptions rank him 3rd all time among linebackers, behind Don Shinnick and Stan White.

"Dobre Shunka" (either Polish or Slovak for "good ham") was Ham's nickname while playing, as well as the name of Ham's fan club in the 1970s.

After retirement
After announcing his retirement as an active player on February 17, 1983, Ham began a career as a radio personality. He served as a color commentator for national radio broadcasts of NFL games, and later hosted a show in Pittsburgh with Mark Madden on ESPN Radio 1250 during the NFL season. Ham is currently a sports analyst for Penn State Radio Network and also appears as an analyst on the Westwood One radio network.

Ham is a minority owner of the North American Hockey League's Johnstown Tomahawks. On January 31, 2013, Ham was honored by the Tomahawks' organization with a bobblehead giveaway to the first 1,000 fans that entered the Cambria County War Memorial Arena for the Tomahawks' game against the Port Huron Fighting Falcons.

In 2017, Ham became an advocate of medical marijuana, having studied the benefits of relieving symptoms related to playing football, and wants the NFL to soften their stance on the use of marijuana in general. Ham felt inspired after seeing the cognitive decline of contemporary Nick Buoniconti, as well as other current and former players including former teammate Mike Webster, despite Ham himself being healthy. Ham also believes medical marijuana would help counter the ongoing opioid epidemic affecting society as a whole.

Honors
Ham was inducted into the Pro Football Hall of Fame in 1988 and the College Football Hall of Fame in 1990.  In 1999, he was ranked number 47 on The Sporting News' list of the 100 Greatest Football Players.

References

External links
 National Polish-American Sports Hall of Fame

1948 births
Living people
American football outside linebackers
College football announcers
Penn State Nittany Lions football players
Pittsburgh Steelers players
National Football League announcers
United States Football League announcers
All-American college football players
American Conference Pro Bowl players
College Football Hall of Fame inductees
Pro Football Hall of Fame inductees
Sportspeople from Johnstown, Pennsylvania
Players of American football from Pennsylvania
American people of Polish descent